Columbus Historic District is a national historic district located at Columbus, Bartholomew County, Indiana.  It encompasses 574 contributing buildings and 1 contributing sites in the central business district and surrounding residential areas of Columbus. It was developed between about 1850 and 1930, and includes notable examples of Federal and Italianate style architecture. A number of commercial buildings feature locally manufactured cast iron and pressed metal components.  Located in the district are the separately listed Bartholomew County Courthouse, Columbus City Hall, and First Christian Church.  Other notable buildings include the First National Bank, The Crump Theatre (1889), Reo Theater, Ulrich Bakery (c. 1850), Samuel Harris House (1853), Keller House (1860), Old Post Office (1910), Franklin Building (c. 1870), Gent Mill (c. 1875), First United Presbyterian Church (1871-1885), Irwin Block (c. 1890), Irwin Home and Gardens (1864, 1910), and St. Batholomew's Roman Catholic Church (1891).

It was listed on the National Register of Historic Places in 1982.

Gallery

References

Historic districts on the National Register of Historic Places in Indiana
Federal architecture in Indiana
Italianate architecture in Indiana
Geography of Bartholomew County, Indiana
National Register of Historic Places in Bartholomew County, Indiana
Columbus, Indiana